Sherali (Cyrillic: Шерали) is a Central Asian masculine given name, a variant of Sher Ali. Notable people with the name include:

Sherali Dostiev (born 1985), Tajikistani boxer 
Sherali Bozorov (born 1981), Tajikistani judoka
Sherali Joʻrayev, Uzbek singer, songwriter, poet, and actor
Sherali Juraev (born 1986), Uzbekistani judoka
Sherali Khayrulloyev, Tajikistani general
Sherali Mirzo, Minister of Defense of Tajikistan
Sher Ali Bacha (1935–1998), Pashtun revolutionary leader
Sher Ali Afridi (died 1873), the Pashtun prisoner who killed the British Viceroy of India